Tramp, Tramp, Tramp is a 1926 American silent comedy film directed by Harry Edwards and starring Harry Langdon and Joan Crawford.

Plot
Harry is a ne'er-do-well who falls in love with Betty a girl on a billboard. Harry participates in a cross country foot race hoping to win prize money in hopes of marrying her.

Harry wins the race when a tornado strikes near the finish line. Harry is so innocently oblivious to it that he simply walks through the disaster while the other contestants run for cover.

Cast
 Harry Langdon as Harry
 Joan Crawford as Betty Burton
 Edwards Davis as John Burton
 Tom Murray as Nick Kargas
 Alec B. Francis as Amos Logan
 Brooks Benedict as Taxi Driver
 Carlton Griffin as Roger Caldwell (uncredited)

Critical reception

In a recent review of the 1926 film, critic Maria Schneider wrote, "Langdon was most often cast as an oblivious innocent adrift in a corrupt world, a formula that made him terrifically popular in the mid-1920s...An acquired taste, Harry Langdon's gentle absurdities and slow rhythms take some getting used to, but patient viewers will be rewarded."

The staff at TV Guide gave the film a mixed review, writing, "An amusing and sunny outdoor comedy, Tramp, Tramp, Tramp seems weak only in comparison with Langdon's next feature, The Strong Man (1926), a much richer blend of laughs, thrills, and tears. Among the earlier film's deficiencies is an anemic story. The bulk of the movie is devoted to little more than a succession of pickles Harry gets himself into on his way west. Nothing is made of the fact that the Logans' landlord and the world walking champion are the same man. (If one isn't paying close attention, one may not be sure that they are the same man). And someone should have thought up a more humorous or exciting way for Harry to win the marathon; a viewer's reconstruction of the script would simply note that 'Harry wins the race.'"

See also
 List of United States comedy films

References

External links

 
 
 Tramp, Tramp, Tramp at the Joan Crawford Encyclopedia
  Tramp, Tramp, Tramp intertitles at intertitle-o-rama.
 

1926 films
1920s English-language films
American silent feature films
American black-and-white films
Films directed by Harry Edwards (director)
Silent American comedy films
Films with screenplays by Gerald Duffy
1926 comedy films
1920s American films